José F. Sosa (born December 25, 1950) is an American Republican Party politician who served in the New Jersey General Assembly from the 7th Legislative District from 1992 to 1994. Sosa was the state's second Hispanic legislator, after Bob Menendez.

Sosa had served on the Mount Holly Township Council and as the township's mayor.

Together with Frank Catania, Sosa was one of the major sponsors of a measure that reduced the state sales tax from 7% to 6%, a measure that reduced taxation on residents by $600 million, as part of the Republican effort to roll back the $2.8 billion in tax increases that had been made by the Democratic-controlled legislature under Governor James Florio.

He has been a resident of Westampton, New Jersey.

References

1950 births
American politicians of Puerto Rican descent
Living people
Mayors of places in New Jersey
Republican Party members of the New Jersey General Assembly
People from Mount Holly, New Jersey
People from San Juan, Puerto Rico
People from Westampton Township, New Jersey
Politicians from Burlington County, New Jersey
Puerto Rican people in New Jersey politics
Hispanic and Latino American state legislators in New Jersey